Bytków TV Tower is a 110 metre tall RadioTV tower in Siemianowice Śląskie, Poland, on the border with Bytków, an urban part of  Katowice. On the top of this concrete tower, there is a horizontal steel cross turned at an angle of 45 degree to the sides of the concrete tower. At the ends of the crossarms, which are equipped with gangways, the antenna mast on its top is guyed.
Bytków TV Tower is operated by company Emitel SA, is not accessible for visitors and is used for directional radio services, FM- and TV-transmissions. It started broadcasting in 1957.

Transmitted programmes

Digital Television MPEG-4

See also
 List of towers

External links
 https://web.archive.org/web/20070930193727/http://emi.emitel.pl/EMITEL/obiekty.aspx?obiekt=DODR_S1G
 https://web.archive.org/web/20070928014816/http://ukf.pl/index.php/topic,47.msg155.html#msg155
 http://www.skyscraperpage.com/diagrams/?b47692
 http://radiopolska.pl/wykaz/pokaz_lokalizacja.php?pid=182

Buildings and structures in Silesian Voivodeship
Radio masts and towers in Poland
1957 establishments in Poland
Towers completed in 1957
Siemianowice Śląskie